Dobroslav II (1081–1103) was King of Duklja, between 1101 and 1102.

Life
His life is only known from the information given in the Chronicle of the Priest of Duklja, according to which he is sometimes called Dobroslav II in modern historiography. Dobroslav was the eldest of four sons of the Dioclean king Michael I and his second wife, a Greek. Dobroslav was about 25 years old at the death of his father, in ca. 1081.

Although being the eldest son, Michael had chosen his favourite, Constantine Bodin, to succeed him. The Venetians had rescued Bodin in 1078 from Byzantine captivity. By 1085, Bodin and his brothers had suppressed a revolt by their cousins, the sons of Michael's brother Radoslav in the župa of Zeta, and Constantine Bodin ruled unchallenged until his death in 1101. Dobroslav succeeded as titular "King of Slavs".

According to the Chronicle of Duklja, Dobroslav was selected by the people to become king after the death of Bodin. However, his reign was short as Vukan, Grand Prince of Serbia, along with the pretender to the Dioclean throne, Kočopar, attacked Duklja, defeating Dobroslav at the Battle of Morača. Dobroslav was overthrown and was banished to inner Serbia. In the meantime, the army from inner Serbia, along with Kočopar and Vukan, took over Dioclea. Kočopar wasn't able to hold his position in Dioclea, and thus escaped to Zachumlia, where he died. Vladimir, Dobroslav's nephew, assumed the throne of Dioclea after Kočopar's death. Dobroslav was later released from prison in inner Serbia and returned to Dioclea. However, upon his arrival, Vladimir imprisoned him in Scutari where he was blinded and castrated on the orders of Bodin's widow, Queen Jaquinta. His last years were spent at the Monastery of Saints Sergius and Bacchus (Sv. Srđa i Vakha) on the Bojana river, where he was buried. He had no issue.

See also
 Vojislavljević dynasty
 Vukanović dynasty

References

Sources

 
 
 
 

1134 deaths
12th-century monarchs in Europe
12th-century Serbian people
Rulers of Duklja
Vojislavljević dynasty
Eastern Orthodox monarchs
Year of birth unknown
Blind royalty and nobility
Serbian exiles